King's College, Lagos (KCL) is a secondary school in Lagos, Lagos State, Nigeria. It was founded on 20 September 1909 with 10 students on its original site at Lagos Island, adjacent to Tafawa Balewa Square. The school admits only male students although historically some female HSC (A-Level equivalent) students were admitted before the establishment of Queen's College Lagos, popularly known as King's College's sister school. King's College conducts exams for the West African School-Leaving Certificate and the National Examinations Council.

History
In 1908, the Nigerian Acting Director of Education in Lagos, Henry Rawlingson Carr advised Governor Walter Egerton on a detailed scheme of education in Lagos. Carr's suggestions and proposals were the basis for the formation of King's College. Carr convinced the London Board of Education that King's College's education mission would not overlap but supplement the education initiatives of missionary societies. As a result, some authors regard Henry Carr as the "architect of King's College". On 20 September 1909 King's School (as it was then called) came into being. There were 10 pioneer students which included J.C. Vaughan, Isaac Ladipo Oluwole, Frank Macaulay, Herbert Mills (from the Gold Coast), O.A. Omololu and Moses King. Oluwole was the first senior prefect of the school. The school building was erected and furnished at a cost of £10,001. It consists of a hall to accommodate 300 students, 8 lecture rooms, a chemical laboratory and an office.

The philosophy of King's School was 
"to provide for the youth of the colony a higher general education than that supplied by the existing Schools, to prepare them for Matriculation Examination of the University of London and to give a useful course of Study to those who intend to qualify for Professional life or to enter Government or Mercantile service."

The staff of the college consists of three Europeans (a principal who gives instruction in English Language, Literature and Latin, a Mathematical and Science Master) with two African assistant teachers. Occasionally, members of the Education Department were engaged as lectures of the evening classes.

The government awarded three scholarships and three exhibitions annually based on merit. The beneficiaries of the scholarships are entitled to free tuition and a government grant of 6 pounds per annum. Conversely, holders of exhibitions receive free tuition; only Hussey Charity Exhibitions tenable at the college was established for indigent students out of the investment proceeds of the premises of the defunct Hussey Charity.

The average attendance of students as at the end of 1910 was 16. This rose to 67 as at the end of 1914.

In 1926, The Development of the Education Department, 1882–1925 was published. Chapter 1, "Annual Report on the Education Development, Southern Provinces, Nigeria, for the year 1926" unearthed interesting facts about the school.

It reads, in part, "...1909 is chiefly noticeable for the opening of King's College as a Government Secondary School under the headmastership of a Mr. Lomax who was seconded from the Survey Department, and who was assisted by two European Masters. The number of boys on the roll was 11. In 1909, Mr. Hyde-Johnson was appointed headmaster of King's College, but nine months later, he succeeded Mr. Rowden as Director of Education...."

That the first headmaster of the college was Mr. Lomax is an outstanding revelation, outstanding because the general conception has always been that Mr. Hyde-Johnson who held that position. Until 1954 when the first edition of the brief history of the college was written, the popular myth was that Mr. Hyde-Johnson was the first principal of King's College. Except for the few surviving foundation students, there was hardly any Old Boy who had ever heard of Mr. Lomax; this pioneer's name was curiously sunk in obscurity.

An insight into life at K.C. in its early years is provided by F.S. Scruby's article dated 24 February 1924 in the Mermaid titled 'Further Glimpse of the Past':

"It revived many memories which are never very dormant to read Ikoli's very flattering recollections of my all too short 'regime' at K.C. Having taught the young Australian out in the 'Bush' in sunny New South Wales and spent holidays in Fiji and the Pacific Islands, it was the pleasurable anticipation that I came to Lagos and was a great disappointment to me to have to resign the post so soon.

"It is a curious thing that Ikoli should have noticed that some boys run the risk of being spoiled. To this day Old Boys from Schools in which I taught in England before going to Lagos remind me of the lasting impression that was made on them when they showed any symptoms of such deterioration. The feasts so generously described in the December number were really only meeting s of the Matriculation class- Oluwole, Vaughan and Macaulay- who use to come up to my quarters once or twice a week to read Shakespeare.

"In looking back on the Physical Training, I am afraid Okoli has taken off his rose-coloured spectacles. The Sergeant of the W.A.R.F.F. who used to come and give lessons were really not very old on peppery. He was a very good Instructor and very fond of boys but the fact remains that P.T. was not popular, and one small boy in particular used to come and report to me regularly that he was 'sore-footed', and take his big dose from the bottle and an hour's work as well. It was my great ambition that a cadet Company should be formed at K.C. as the first company of a Lagos Cadet Battalion School were circularized by the Education Department, but the scheme fell through.

"It is a great joy though it is not a matter of Surprise to know that K.C. has prospered during the last 13 years with the development of the House System and Inter-house Sports."

Organization

Houses and classes
There are four houses in the school named after former principals. Hyde-Johnson's House (red), Panes' House (blue), Mckee-Wright's House (yellow) and Harman's House (green). It has ten arms per class (as of the 2017–2018 session), They are A, Alpha, C, D, E, F, G, H, J and K. King's College Lagos makes use of the Greek letter Alpha instead of the letter B as the second arm of their classes.

Campuses
Due to population constraints, the school was divided into two campuses, with the senior school moving into the premises of the former Federal School for Arts and Sciences (F.S.A.S) on Victoria Island. (The school administration was still under the control of one principal and ultimately under the control of the Federal Ministry of Education.) This meant that the senior classes of the school (classes 1–3) were now in the Victoria Island "Annex," as that campus came to be known.

Presently, King's College, Lagos has a junior school. The seniors are now split as follows: SS1 to SS3 boys are found in the Main Camp (Tafawa Balewa Square), while JSS1 to JSS2 boys are found in the annex campus (Victoria Island). The former PKC, Otunba 'Dele Olapeju, assumed office in January, 2010 and bowed out of service in November, 2015. He moved the senior students from the annex to the main campus. Today, King's College is wearing a new look. He has erected a number of structures both at the main campus and at the annex campus. The students' results are now online, with parents and guardians being able to follow up on their children/wards' academic and extra-curricular activities using the students' log-in details which have been given to them.

Prefects
As of the 2014–2015 session, King's College Lagos had 45 prefect positions.

Education and social life of student 
King's College Lagos has proved its educational quality for centuries and has passed the test of time. Unproven information reports that King's College Lagos performed at a 90% success rate in May/June 2015 WASSCE. Socially, KC proves to be one of the best, as yearly activities such as the inter-house sports competition, the annual bi-lateral games with Achimota School Ghana, and the King's College/Queen's College Graduation ball for outgoing SS3 students have become prominent social events in King's College.

The annual KIGS cup is an important sporting event. It is an elite quadrangular cricket tournament with four schools participating - King's College, Igbobi College, Government College Ibadan and St. Gregory's College.

The annual Ikoyi Run is also one of King's College's major sporting event. Ikoyi Run is a marathon with the four houses competing.

There is also an annual inter-house athletics competition with the four houses competing.

Uniform
The school uniform consists of a white shirt (long-sleeved for those in the senior school and short-sleeved for those in the junior school), a school tie and/or a school badge, white trousers, black belt, socks and black laced shoes and a blue blazer. The wearing of the blazer became compulsory under Principal Mr. S. M. Onoja.

Principals 
The first principal of the school was a Sir Lomax, while the first African principal was Rex Akpofure. The current principal of the school is Ali Andrew Agada. Some other principals were:
Lomax (1909–1910)
G.H. Hyde-Johnson (1910)
McKee Wright (? - 1917)
J.A. de Gaye (1917–1919)
D.L. Kerr (1919)
H.A.A.F. Harman (1919–1925)
W.M. Peacock (1926–1931)
J.N. Panes (1931–1936)
A.H Clift (1936–1947)
A.D. Porter (1947)
G.P. Savage (1948)
J.R. Bunting (1949–1954)
P. H. Davis (1957 to 1964)
Rex Akpofure (1964–1968)(first indigenous principal)
R. S. G. Agiobu-Kemmer (1968–1975)
M.O. Imana (1975–1978)
Augustine A. Ibegbulam (1978–1985)
S. O. Agun (1985–1992)
S. A. Akinruli (1992–1994)
S. I. Balogun
Sylvester M. Onoja
Yetunde Awofuwa 
Akintoye A. Ojemuyiwa
Otunba Oladele Olapeju
Anthony Thomas 
Ibezim Elizabeth 
Agada Ali Andrew

1.  Following the departure of Onoja, Yetunde Awofuwa who happened to be the most senior ranked teacher was appointed as Acting Principal of the school. She was never fully confirmed as a principal of the school. She later left to become principal of the Federal Government Girls College, Oyo. She was the first and only female principal of the school.

Prominent alumni

 Simeon Adebo, Administrator, lawyer, and diplomat
 Lateef Adegbite, Secretary-General of the Nigerian Supreme Council for Islamic Affairs
 Wale Adenuga, film producer
 Adetokunbo Ademola, former Chief Justice of the Federal Republic of Nigeria
 Claude Ake, Professor of Political Economy, International scholar and Social crusader
 Sam Akpabot, music composer
 Ephraim Akpata, Justice of the Supreme Court of Nigeria
 Rotimi Alakija, Nigerian disc jockey, record producer and recording artist.
 Sola Akinyede, Federal Senator 2007–2011
 Cobhams Asuquo, African music producer
 Hakeem Bello-Osagie, CEO Etisalat Nigeria
 Russel Dikko, physician and former Federal Commissioner for Mines and Power
 Alex Ekwueme, former Vice President of Nigeria
 Arnold Ekpe, banker
 Chief Anthony Enahoro, journalist and democracy advocate
 Ibrahim Gambari, United Nations representative
 Akanu Ibiam, Governor of the Eastern Region and Medical doctor
 Asue Ighodalo, Lawyer and partner at Banwo and Ighodalo
 Oladipo Jadesimi, businessman
 Lateef Jakande, former Governor of Lagos State and former Federal Minister of Works & Housing
 Adetokunbo Lucas, physician and international expert on tropical diseases
 Vincent I. Maduka, President of the Nigerian Society of Engineers (1992–1993)
 Audu Maikori, Lawyer, entrepreneur, activist, and youth leader, CEO Chocolate City Music
 Samuel Manuwa, Surgeon and administrator
 Babagana Monguno, Nigerian National Security Adviser
 Gogo Chu Nzeribe, Nigerian trade unionist and a leader of the nation's communist movement 
 Audu Ogbeh, former PDP Chairman and Minister of Agriculture
 Adebayo Ogunlesi, current chairman and managing partner of Global Infrastructure Partners
 Emeka Ojukwu, Governor of the Eastern Region of Nigeria & Head of State of the defunct Republic of Biafra
 Lateef Olufemi Okunnu, Lawyer and University Administrator
 Kole Omotosho, Author and academic
 Victor Ovie Whisky, Chairman of the Federal Electoral Commission (FEDECO)
 Adeyinka Oyekan, Oba of Lagos from 1965 to 2003
 Atedo Peterside, banker, entrepreneur and the founder of Stanbic IBTC Bank Plc
 Christopher Oluwole Rotimi, retired Nigerian Army Brigadier General, diplomat and politician.
 Sanusi Lamido Sanusi, Emir of Kano, and former Governor of the Central Bank of Nigeria
 Bukola Saraki, Former President of the Senate of Nigeria, and former Governor of Kwara State
 Fela Sowande, Musicologist and composer
 Udoma Udo Udoma, Federal Senator (1999–2007) and Chairman of UAC of Nig. Plc
 Shamsudeen Usman, former Finance Minister of Nigeria
 Olumide Akpata, President Nigerian Bar Association
 James Churchill Vaughan, co-founder and first president of the Lagos Youth Movement in 1934

Photo gallery

References

External links
official website of King's college Lagos
King's College Old Boys Association
Portal for King's College Lagos Boys and Old Boys
KC Alumni set of 1988 website

Secondary schools in Lagos State
Educational institutions established in 1909
1909 establishments in the Southern Nigeria Protectorate
History of Lagos
Boys' schools in Nigeria
Lagos Island
Victoria Island, Lagos
Schools in Lagos